George Garzone (born September 23, 1950) is a saxophonist and jazz educator from Boston, Massachusetts.

Biography
Garzone is a member of the Fringe, a jazz trio founded in 1972 that includes bassist John Lockwood and drummer Bob Gullotti. The group has released several albums. Garzone has appeared on over 20 recordings. He began on tenor saxophone when he was six, played in a family band, and attended music school in Boston. He toured Europe with Jamaaladeen Tacuma and performed with Jack DeJohnette, Joe Lovano, John Patitucci, Danilo Pérez, Rachel Z, and Bob Weir and Ratdog.

Garzone is also a jazz educator, teaching at the Berklee College of Music, New England Conservatory, Longy School of Music, New York University, and the New School for Jazz and Contemporary Music. He pioneered the triadic chromatic approach. His students include Mindi Abair, Branford Marsalis, Donny McCaslin, Danilo Pérez, Joshua Redman, Luciana Souza, and Mark Turner.

In 1995 he recorded a tribute to Stan Getz on NYC Records called Alone. Four's and Two's followed a year later with Joe Lovano, and in 1999 Garzone returned with Moodiology. Fringe in New York was released in summer 2000. With the Joe Lovano Nonet he recorded at the Village Vanguard in September 2002.

He has also performed with Don Alias, Kenny Barron, Dennis Chambers, Stanley Cowell, Anton Fig, Dan Gottlieb, Tom Harrell, Dave Holland, Dave Liebman, Cecil McBee, Bob Moses, Gary Peacock, Marvin Smith, Bill Stewart, Harvie Swartz, and Lenny White.

Triadic chromatic approach
The triadic chromatic approach is an improvisatory approach created by George Garzone while teaching at colleges in Boston and New York City. The approach was developed to allow the improviser to be able to improvise freely without having to concern themselves with what is going on harmonically.

This approach is applied by selecting one the four standard triads (major, minor, augmented, and diminished) and moving by a half step into another inversion of the same type of triad. This is a broad definition and there are many ways to be able to manipulate and change this approach.

Discography

As leader
 Alone (NYC, 1995)
 Four's and Two's (NYC, 1995)
 Demetrio's Dream (Nel Jazz, 1996)
 Moodiology (NYC, 1999)
 The Fringe in New York (NYC, 2000)
 Onetwothreefour (Stunt, 2006)
 Night of My Beloved (Venus, 2008)
 Among Friends (Stunt, 2009)
 Filing the Profile (Intuition, 2011)
 Audacity (Challenge, 2012)
 Quintonic (Stunt, 2014)
 3 Nights in L.A. (Fuzzy Music, 2019)

With The Fringe
 The Fringe (Ap-Gu-Ga, 1978)
 Live ! (Ap-Gu-Ga, 1980)
 Hey, Open Up! (Ap-Gu-Ga, 1982)
 The Raging Bulls (Ap-Gu-Ga, 1986)
 The Return of the Neanderthal Man (Northeastern, 1990)
 It's Time for the Fringe (Soul Note, 1993)
 Live in Israel (Soul Note, 1997)
 Live in Iseo (Soul Note, 2001)

As sideman
 Magnus Bakken, Cycles (AMP, 2015)
 Ben Besiakov, Aviation (Stunt, 2000)
 Ben Besiakov, Hey Why Don't We Play (Stunt, 2002)
 Randy Brecker, The Avatar Sessions (Fuzzy Music, 2009)
 Claire Daly, Swing Low (Koch, 1999)
 Aydin Esen, Pictures (Bellaphon, 1989)
 Diego Figueiredo, Broken Bossa (Stunt, 2015)
 Leo Genovese, Seeds (Palmetto, 2013)
 Daniel Humair, Quatre Fois Trois (Label Bleu, 1997)
 Ingrid Jensen, Vernal Fields (Enja, 1995)
 Tom Kennedy, Just Play! (Capri, 2013)
 Brian Landrus, Forward (Cadence, 2009)
 Joe Lovano, 52nd Street Themes (Blue Note, 2000)
 Joe Lovano, On This Day...at the Vanguard (Blue Note, 2003)
 Joe Lovano, Streams of Expression (Blue Note, 2006)
 Matthias Lupri, Shadow of the Vibe (Chartmaker, 1999)
 Mike Mainieri, An American Diary (NYC, 1997)
 Bob Moses, Love Everlasting (Amulet, 1999)
 Wolfgang Muthspiel, Black & Blue (Amadeo, 1992)
 Jorn Oien, Short Stories (Resonant Music, 2004)
 Orange Then Blue, Live: Where Were You? (GM, 1989)
 Rachel Z, Room of One's Own (NYC, 1996)
 Pete Robbins, Centric (Telepathy, 2001)
 Jeff Rupert, The Ripple (Rupe Media, 2020)
 George Russell, The African Game (Blue Note, 1985)
 George Russell, So What (Blue Note, 1986)
 George Schuller, Lookin' Up from Down Below (GM, 1989)
 George Schuller, Tenor Tantrums (New World, 1999)
 Gunther Schuller, Jumpin' in the Future (GM, 1988)
 Judi Silvano, Cleome Live Takes (JSL, 2008)
 Luciana Souza, An Answer to Your Silence (NYC, 1998)
 Martin Taylor, Kiss and Tell (Columbia, 1999)
 Frank Tiberi, Tiberian Mode (NY Jam, 1999)

References

External links
 Official web site
 Berklee College of Music faculty page

1950 births
Living people
21st-century American male musicians
21st-century American saxophonists
American jazz saxophonists
American male jazz musicians
American male saxophonists
American music educators
American people of Italian descent
Jazz musicians from Massachusetts
New England Conservatory faculty